Programmed is a 1999 studio album by Innerzone Orchestra, which consists of Carl Craig and assorted musicians. It peaked at number 38 on the UK R&B Albums Chart.

Critical reception
John Bush of AllMusic gave the album 4.5 stars out of 5, describing it as "a work of electronic music in the abstract that rejects the accepted standards of any style of music, whether it's techno, electronica, jazzy house, or recent fusion." Joshua Klein of The A.V. Club said, "Craig's genius is illustrated in how he devises ways to incorporate live instruments into the mix so they sound like they're communicating with the machine-generated programming."

Track listing

Charts

Release history

References

Further reading

External links
 

1999 albums
Carl Craig albums